Esley Leite Nascimento, better known as Esley (Victoria, April 15, 1979), is a Brazilian footballer who acts as half who currently plays for São Caetano.

Contract
 Ceará.

References

External links
zerozerofootball.com

1979 births
Brazilian footballers
Living people
Grêmio Barueri Futebol players
Ceará Sporting Club players
Mirassol Futebol Clube players
Fortaleza Esporte Clube players
Clube Atlético Bragantino players
Associação Desportiva São Caetano players
Association football midfielders
Sportspeople from Espírito Santo